commonly abbreviated as Nintendo R&D1, was Nintendo's oldest video game development team. It was known as  before splitting in 1978. Its creation coincided with Nintendo's entry into the video game industry, and the original R&D1 was headed by Gunpei Yokoi. The developer has created several notable Nintendo series such as Metroid, Mario Bros. and Donkey Kong.

R&D1 developed the hugely successful Game Boy line, which was released in 1989.  They developed some of the line's most popular games, such as Super Mario Land, and created the character of Wario.

Team Shikamaru was a small club within Nintendo R&D1 that was composed of Makoto Kano, Yoshio Sakamoto, and Toru Osawa. The group was responsible for designing characters and coming up with scripts for several games including Metroid, Kid Icarus, Famicom Detective Club, Trade & Battle: Card Hero, and several others.

After Yokoi's resignation in 1997, this group was led by Takehiro Izushi. In 2004, Satoru Iwata restructured the Nintendo R&D1 team. Many of the staff members were later reassigned to the Nintendo SPD team, which in turn merged with Nintendo EAD in 2015 to form Nintendo Entertainment Planning & Development.

History

Background
In 1965, Nintendo, still primarily a hanafuda card manufacturer, hired Gunpei Yokoi, a newly graduated electronics engineer. Yokoi was assigned to the manufacturing division to work on the assembly line machines used to manufacture its cards. In the following year, Hiroshi Yamauchi, president of Nintendo at the time, during a visit to the factory Yokoi was working at, took notice of a toy, an extending arm, that Yokoi had made for his own amusement during his spare time. As Yamauchi was looking to diversify the company's business far beyond its primary card business, Yokoi was ordered to develop the toy into a proper mass-market product for the 1966 holiday rush. The toy was launched as Ultra Hand and it was a huge success selling over 1.2 million units during its lifetime. Following that, Yokoi was assigned to work on other toys including the Ten Billion Barrel puzzle, a miniature remote-controlled vacuum cleaner called the Chiritory, a baseball throwing machine called the Ultra Machine, and a "Love Tester."

1970s-1978: Creation and first electronic games

Sometime before 1972, Nintendo created its first electronics development team, the Research & Development department from Nintendo's manufacturing division, assigning Gunpei Yokoi as its general manager. By 1972 the department had approximately 20 developers. In 1978, the manufacturing division split its single research & development department into two, renaming it to Research & Development No. 1 (R&D1) and creating the Nintendo Research & Development No. 2 (R&D2) department. After the split, Yokoi remained general manager of R&D1.

1979-1988: Game & Watch

In the late 1970s, Yokoi saw a bored Japanese salaryman playing with a calculator on the Shinkansen high-speed train. This was the inspiration for the creation of the Game & Watch series, a line of handheld electronic games, with each system featuring a single game to be played on an LCD screen in addition to a clock, an alarm, or both. Regardless, it was confirmed that Yokoi was inspired by calculators to develop the line, even using calculator integrated circuits in the systems and button cells to power them. Although Nintendo competitors Mattel and Tomy had already produced portable games, they were mostly bulky systems with low-resolution LED displays and uninspiring gameplay. Yokoi exploited the cheapness of LCDs, producing cheap and light systems, starting in 1980. He would later call this principle Lateral Thinking of Withered Technology: using seasoned technology in radical ways; a principle that echoed throughout Nintendo until the present day.

In 1980, Game & Watch: Ball was the first release of the Game & Watch Silver series, called after its metallic face-plate. Sales weren't reportedly "astonishing", but they were enough to persuade Nintendo to continue developing new titles. The series saw a total of 5 systems, all released during that year. In 1981, Game & Watch: Manhole debuted the Gold series, which was fundamentally the same system with a golden face-plate. It saw only 3 titles which were also released during the same year. In mid-1981, Game & Watch: Parachute was released, debuting the Wide Screen series, sporting a 30% larger display. The series saw a total of 10 titles released until early 1982.

The limitations of the LCD display prompted Yokoi and his team to introduce the Multi Screen series with the release of Game & Watch: Oil Panic in mid 1982, adding another screen to potentially double the amount of gameplay each title could offer. The next title of the series was Game & Watch: Donkey Kong a port of the hugely successful Donkey Kong arcade game. Unable to use a joystick like the original game, as it would reduce the system's portability, Yokoi began researching for solutions. Early Game & Watch systems had a button for each action such as moving left and right or jumping. However, for the new system the team introduced the "cross" directional pad (D-pad): a flat, four-way directional control with one button on each point. The design was patented and later earned a Technology & Engineering Emmy Award in 2008. From then on, all major video game consoles since have had a D-pad of some shape on their controllers, until the Nintendo Switch in 2017.

1989-1990: Game Boy

When the department started working on a successor to the Game & Watch series, Yokoi envisioned a simple and cheap system with interchangeable game cartridges. Development of the system, however, suffered from disagreements in direction, with assistant director Satoru Okada arguing for a more powerful system with third-party development and long-term support from Nintendo, emulating the successful business model that Nintendo R&D2 had achieved with the Nintendo Entertainment System, while Yokoi planned for a much cheaper, less powerful device with a shorter life-span, similar to its predecessor.  During an interview, Okada compared the initial project to the Microvision. Eventually, Yokoi agreed to Okada's plan and the project would be known as the Game Boy.

1991-1994: Virtual Boy

In 1991, Nintendo partnered with Massachusetts-based Reflection Technology, Inc. who had developed a 3D stereoscopic head-tracking prototype called the Private Eye. Gunpei Yokoi saw this as a unique technology that competitors would find difficult to emulate. Additionally, the resulting game console was intended to enhance Nintendo's reputation as an innovator and to "encourage more creativity" in games. Code-naming the project "VR32", Nintendo entered into an exclusive agreement with Reflection Technology to license the technology for its displays.

Spending four years in development and eventually building a dedicated manufacturing plant in China, Nintendo worked to turn its VR32 vision into an affordable and health-conscious console design. Yokoi retained RTI's choice of red LED because it was the cheapest, and because unlike a totally backlit LCD, its perfect blackness could achieve a more immersive sense of infinite depth. A color LCD system was also said to have caused "jumpy images in tests". With ongoing concerns about motion sickness, the risk of developing lazy eye conditions in young children, and Japan's new Product Liability Act of 1995, Nintendo eliminated the head tracking functionality and converted its headmounted goggle design into a stationary, heavy, precision steel-shielded, tabletop form factor conformant to the recommendation of the Schepens Eye Research Institute.

According to David Sheff's book Game Over, the increasingly reticent Yokoi never actually intended for the increasingly downscaled console to be released in its final form. However, Nintendo pushed the Virtual Boy to market so that it could focus development resources on the Nintendo 64.

1995: Game Boy successor

In 1995, the department started developing a successor to the Game Boy, under the code-name Atlantis. Despite its predecessors having a monochrome display, the R&D1 team had already experimented with color displays from as early as 1992. The Atlantis prototype consisted of an handheld with a 32-bit ARM7 CPU, a larger color display, and four face buttons. It was reported that the system was supposed to release in late 1996.

Meanwhile, the department was also working on a revision of the Game Boy. The system would require fewer batteries, providing approximately 10 hours of gameplay, and was also equipped with a DC connector which could be used to power the system. The screen was also changed to a true black-and-white display, rather than the green-tinted monochrome display of the original Game Boy, and had an improved pixel response-time, mostly eliminating the ghosting effect. It finally released as the Game Boy Pocket on July 21, 1996, in Japan, on September 3 in North America, and in Europe during the following year. Although it had no power LED initially, it was soon added to later editions due public demand.

Following the commercial success of the Game Boy Pocket, the Atlantis system was delayed by a year to late 1997. Nonetheless, the system was eventually cancelled due to concerns of it being too big, having a drastically decreased battery life (to approximately 1 hour, as LCD color displays required a back-light at the time), and being too expensive to manufacture. Although it was shelved, the project would later considerably speed up the development of the Game Boy Color in 1997 by the Nintendo Research & Engineering department.

1996-2003: Gunpei Yokoi's departure and hardware team spin-off

On August 15, 1996, long-time department general manager, Gunpei Yokoi, left Nintendo to form his own company, Koto Laboratory. Despite speculation that he had left Nintendo due to the commercial failure of the Virtual Boy a year prior, Yokoi clarified that he'd long wished to become independent. Yokoi and his new company eventually worked on the WonderSwan handheld for Bandai before his tragic death in 1997 in a traffic accident. In order to fill Yokoi's vacancy, long-time Nintendo engineer Takehiro Izushi was appointed as the new general manager of the department. Additionally, the department's hardware team was spun-off into a new development department, called Nintendo Research & Engineering and led by Satoru Okada. The software development team, however, remained at R&D1. This new department would be responsible for continuing the Game Boy's legacy becoming the source of every major Nintendo handheld game console until its closure in 2012.

Following Yokoi's departure, and no longer having a dedicated hardware development team, the department focused instead on developing games for other Nintendo-developed consoles. It was responsible for the re-releases of its Game & Watch classics in the Game & Watch Gallery series for both the Game Boy and Game Boy Color, starting in 1997. It also developed sequels to its Wario Land classic in the form of Wario Land II, released in 1998, and Wario Land 3, in 2000, both for the Game Boy Color, and Wario Land 4 for the Game Boy Advance, released a year later. The department was also responsible for creating the Wario spin-off series with WarioWare, Inc.: Mega Microgames!, released in 2003 for the Game Boy Advance. After an 8-year hiatus, R&D1 introduced a new installment in its Metroid series, Metroid Fusion, released in 2002. In 2004, R&D1's last project was launched, Metroid: Zero Mission a remake of the original game.

2004: Absorbed into Nintendo Software Planning & Development

In 2004, the department, along with Nintendo Research & Development 2, was absorbed into the newly created Nintendo Software Planning & Development division. Then-Nintendo president Satoru Iwata created and appointed himself as general manager of the new division to focus on co-producing and supervising second-party development, thus relieving the Entertainment Analysis & Development division (EAD) and its general manager Shigeru Miyamoto to focus on first-party projects. Although that was the division's primary focus, it went on to develop some video games titles internally.

In 2018, former general manager of the R&D1 department Takehiro Izushi retired from Nintendo after 43 years in the company.

Products developed

Electronic games

Video game consoles

Video games

Notes

References

External links
IGN listing for R&D1
N-Sider: The Rise and Fall of R&D1

Nintendo divisions and subsidiaries
Defunct video game companies of Japan
Video game companies disestablished in 2004
Video game development companies
Japanese companies disestablished in 2004